Benedetto Cottone (4 December 1917 – 13 June 2018) was an Italian politician.

Born on 4 December 1917 in Marsala, Benedetto Cottone was elected to the municipal council prior to winning his first parliamentary election in 1953. He lost reelection in 1958, then returned to the Chamber of Deputies in 1963 for three more consecutive terms, stepping down in 1976.

He died in Rome on 13 June 2018.

References

1917 births
2018 deaths
People from Marsala
Deputies of Legislature II of Italy
Deputies of Legislature IV of Italy
Deputies of Legislature V of Italy
Deputies of Legislature VI of Italy
Italian centenarians
Men centenarians
Monarchist National Party politicians
Italian Liberal Party politicians